Community studies is an academic field drawing on both sociology and anthropology and the social research methods of ethnography and participant observation in the study of community. In academic settings around the world, community studies is variously a sub-discipline of anthropology or sociology, or an independent discipline. It is often interdisciplinary and geared toward practical applications rather than purely theoretical perspectives. Community studies is sometimes combined with other fields, i.e., "Urban and Community Studies," "Health and Community Studies," or "Family and Community studies."

Epistemology 
In North America, community studies drew inspiration from the classic urban sociology texts produced by the Chicago School, such as the works of Louis Wirth and William Foote Whyte. In Britain, community studies was developed for colonial administrators working in East Africa, particularly Kenya.  It was further developed in the post-war period with the Institute of Community Studies founded by Michael Young in east London, and with the studies published from the institute, such as Family and Kinship in East London.

Community studies, like colonial anthropology, have often assumed the existence of discrete, relatively homogeneous, almost tribe-like communities, which can be studied as organic wholes. In this, it has been a key influence on communitarianism and communalism, from the local context to the global and everywhere in between.

Curricula 

Community studies curricula are often centered on the "concerns" of communities. These include mental and physical health, stress, addiction, AIDS, racism, immigration, ethnicity, gender, identity, sexuality, the environment, crime, deviance, delinquency, family problems, social competence, poverty, homelessness and other psycho-social aspects. Understanding the socio-cultural completeness and the anthropological ramifications of the accurate analysis of community health is key to the sphere of these studies.

Another focus of curricula in community studies is upon anthropology, cultural anthropology in particular. Some programs set as prerequisite knowledge, the background and historical contexts for community, drawing upon archeological findings and the theoretical underpinnings for social organization in ancient and prehistorical community settings. The theories connected with the so-called "Neolithic revolution" is one example of a deep study into how, where and why, hunter-gatherer communities formed.

Community studies have been linked to the causes of social justice, promoting peace and nonviolence and working towards social change, often within an activist framework.

Schools with Community studies concentrations 
Urban and Community Studies at the University of Connecticut
Community Studies Program at the University of Colorado Boulder.
Urban and Community Studies at the Rochester Institute of Technology.
College of Community and Public Service at the University of Massachusetts Boston
Child, Family and Community Studies Integrated Curriculum Courses at Douglas College (BC, Canada)
Center for Community Studies at Peabody College-Vanderbilt
The Centre for Urban and Community Studies at the University of Toronto
Institute of Health and Community Studies at Bournemouth University (UK)
Pan African Center for Community Studies at the University of Akron
Department of Educational Policy & Community Studies at the University of Wisconsin–Milwaukee.
Integrative Studies Concentrations - Community at George Mason University
Department of Community, Agriculture, Recreation and Resource Studies at Michigan State University
Department of Social Policy and Education at Birkbeck, University of London (UK)
Department of Community and Regional Development at University of California, Davis
Center for Urban Studies at Istanbul Sehir University
Department of Community Studies at University of California, Santa Cruz
Center for Communal Studies at the University of Southern Indiana

Notes

Further reading 
Community development
Community psychology

Sources 
 Community studies at informal education

Community
Environmental social science